Costanzo Antegnati (9 December 1549 - 14 November 1624) was an organist, organ builder and composer.

Biography
He was born in Brescia, to a family of prolific organ builders, a profession which also included his father Graziadio.  His was musically educated by Giovanni Contino and Girolamo Cavazzoni.

Organ builder
At age 21, he was sent by his father, who reassured the Duke Guglielmo Gonzaga of his son's abilities, to fix the organ of the basilica of Santa Barbara in Mantua.
Additionally, Costanzo worked with his father in the construction of the Antegnati organ, at one time the largest and most famous in the world, which was built in 1581 for the friars of St. Joseph's Church in Brescia.

In 1595 he was commissioned by Catherine Gonzaga, daughter of the Marquis Alfonso Gonzaga, for the construction of the organ at the Church of St. Erasmus Prepositurale in Castel Goffredo.  Although few of his instruments survive, the remarkable Organ Antegnati of the church of St. Nicholas (1588) in Bergamo was restored in 1996.  He is most famous for the work L'arte organica (1608) which provides technical details of 144 organs built by his family, rules about the tuning of organs and harpsichords, and advice regarding organ registration.

Organist and composer
Costanzo was an organist at the Brescia cathedral from 1584 until 1619.  Despite suffering a stroke sometime near 1600, he continued as principal organist.  He was relieved of his duties as organist in 1620 because of his crippled left hand.  He was not dismissed from his post and of his salary, as he was deemed "worthy of the city".

He wrote several Masses and madrigals between 1571 and 1592, and published a book of organ pieces, including some of his own, in 1608.  In 1571 he published, in Venice, The First Book of Madrigals for Four Voices with a Dialogue for Eight. Subsequently, he published, on an almost biennial basis, anthologies of mainly sacred compositions (Masses, psalms and motets), but also including secular works.

Antegnati's family tree

References

 Gli Antegnati. Studi e documenti su una stirpe di organari bresciani del Rinascimento, a cura di Oscar Mischiati, Bologna, Pàtron editore, 1995 (Biblioteca di cultura organaria e organistica, 9).
 Flavio Dassenno Bellissimi organi bresciani Provincia di Brescia, 2002

External links
 

Italian pipe organ builders
Renaissance composers
1549 births
1624 deaths
Male classical composers